TANGS is a department store located on Orchard Road in Singapore, owned by C.K. Tang Limited. The store is regarded as a principal shopping destination in the city, comparable to Bloomingdale's in New York City and Selfridges in London. The company was founded by Tang Choon Keng in 1932.

History 

C.K. Tang, the founder, migrated from China and began his business from a provisional store in 1932. CK Tang's first stores were on River Valley Road, but in the 1950s, he purchased land on Orchard Road as he noticed that the expatriates from the Holland Village area would travel down this road to go downtown.

When CK Tang bought the land, it was situated opposite a Chinese cemetery, which, under cultural conventions, was perceived to bring bad luck.

TANGS is credited with sparking the transformation of the area into Singapore's most famous shopping district. In 1982, C.K. Tang purchased the adjacent Tang Plaza, which currently houses the Singapore Marriott Hotel.

In the late 1980s and early 1990s one of CK Tang's sons, Tang Wee Sung took control of the store. He went on to become chairman of the company in 2000 after his father's death, and his appointment gave rise to changed operating policies, such as permitting the store to remain open on Sundays and introducing marketing strategies to increase consumer choice.

In 2012, TANGS announced an S$45 million, three-year transformation plan to its flagship store on Orchard Road.

Architecture 
The building form was influenced by traditional Chinese culture and architecture, modeled after the Palaces in the Forbidden City. The color scheme of C.K. Tang building mimics a traditional imperial palace, with the green roof tiles symbolizing the notion of growth and prosperity, the yellow facade symbolizing the color of royalty, and red columns representing happiness.

The design follows the Chinese belief of ‘feng-shui’, a traditional Chinese philosophical system, which is prominent in the octagonal decorations consistent all over the building. The eight-sided shape is auspicious as the number ‘8’, pronounced as ‘fa´ in Chinese dialect implies prosperity. Apart from the visually prominent octagonal roof form of the tower, there are several other instances of octagonal designs all over the building. These include the floor tiling, column base and ceiling decorations, and railings.

Other features like the distinctive ‘artichoke leaf’ or ‘xie-shan’ roof, designed to repel rain as well as allow wind circulation within the structure. The ridges of the roofs are aligned with figures of miniature mythical creatures which is a symbolism of formidableness in Chinese culture, along with the stone statues of lions up-front.

Prior to its 2012 transformation, TANGS occupied  and boasted five selling floors, designed by New York-based Hambrecht Terrell International, noted for its work with Saks Fifth Avenue and Macy's.

Expansion

VivoCity 
In 2006, TANGS opened as an anchor tenant at shopping mall VivoCity.

Malaysia 
Tangs marked its return to the Malaysian market with a store within Pavilion KL in 2007. The store has since relocated to 1 Utama, this was followed by new locations in Subang Jaya (Empire Subang), and subsequent openings at Genting Highlands (First World Plaza) and Malacca. Tangs once again withdraws from Malaysia in 2020, with the branches at Subang Jaya and Genting Highlands renamed as Galeries Voir, the Malacca branch renamed as Best Value Outlet, while the 1 Utama branch closed down.

References

External links 
 

1932 establishments in Singapore
Department stores of Malaysia
Department stores of Singapore
Shopping malls in Singapore
Singaporean brands